Kuresoo Bog is a bog in Viljandi County, Estonia. The bog is located in Soomaa National Park. This bog is one of the largest in Estonia.

The area of the bog is 10,843 ha.

Restoration Efforts
The restoration of Kuresoo Bog has been an ongoing effort in Estonia, the main goal of the restoration is to use different damming technologies, such that Sphagnum growth is at a good level.

References

Viljandi County
Bogs of Estonia